William Miller (August 3, 1820 – August 8, 1909) was an American soldier, attorney, timberman, and politician. He served as a general in the Confederate States Army during the American Civil War. One of the few Northern-born Confederate generals, he led the reserve troops of the state of Florida and helped win one of the South's last victories of the war at the Battle of Natural Bridge.

Biography
Miller was born in Ithaca, New York, but moved to Louisiana with his family while still a young child. He attended Louisiana College. He studied law, passed his bar exam, and engaged in a private practice in Santa Rosa County. He was engaged in the timber and lumber business in northwest Florida prior to the Civil War.

Miller formed a unit, the 3rd Florida Infantry Battalion, and was commissioned as its lieutenant colonel. He and his men eventually were consolidated with the 1st Florida Infantry Battalion, forming the (new) 1st Florida Infantry Regiment. Miller became the regimental colonel in August 1862. Later that year, he fought at the Battle of Perryville, suffering a minor wound, and the Battle of Stones River, where he was severely wounded. He returned home to Florida to recuperate for several months. He was placed in charge of the Confederate Conscript Bureau for Alabama and South Florida.

On August 2, 1864, Miller was promoted to brigadier general and appointed to organize and coordinate the state's reserve troops as the new commander of the Florida District. He raised and commanded the 1st Florida Reserves, a regiment recruited to help defend the state, as most of the regular Confederate troops were serving elsewhere. His most prominent action came at the Battle of Natural Bridge in March 1865, where he served as the tactical field commander in defeating Union forces under John Newton. His men repelled three separate Union attacks during the 12-hour battle. The battle helped keep the state capital, Tallahassee, under Confederate control. It would prove to be the last state capital east of the Mississippi to remain in Confederate hands.

Miller and his men finally surrendered in Tallahassee in May 1865.

After the war, Miller returned to his timber business and also established a farm. He eventually settled in Port Washington in Walton County, where he became the justice of the peace. Miller served two terms in the Florida House of Representatives and the Florida Senate.

He was initially buried in Point Washington Cemetery, but in 1922, he and his wife were exhumed and reinterred in St. Johns Cemetery in Pensacola, Florida.

See also

List of American Civil War generals (Confederate)

Notes

References
 Eicher, John H., and David J. Eicher, Civil War High Commands. Stanford: Stanford University Press, 2001. .
 Sifakis, Stewart. Who Was Who in the Civil War. New York: Facts On File, 1988. .
 Warner, Ezra J. Generals in Gray: Lives of the Confederate Commanders. Baton Rouge: Louisiana State University Press, 1959. .
Civil War Florida - bio of Miller
News Herald - bio of Miller

1820 births
1909 deaths
Confederate States Army brigadier generals
People from Walton County, Florida
People of Florida in the American Civil War
American military personnel of the Mexican–American War
Florida state senators
Members of the Florida House of Representatives
Northern-born Confederates
Politicians from Ithaca, New York
People from Santa Rosa County, Florida
19th-century American politicians